Ghazi Stadium is a multi-purpose stadium located in eastern Kabul, Afghanistan, which is mainly used for association football matches. It is sometimes called by other names such as the Afghan Football Federation Stadium. It was built during the reign of King Amanullah Khan in 1923, who is regarded as Ghazi (Hero) for the Afghan victory in the Third Anglo-Afghan War and gaining independence for his nation after the Anglo-Afghan Treaty of 1919. The stadium has capacity to house 25,000 people after the installation of seats.

The Ghazi Stadium was renovated in 2011 after the entire ground was removed and replaced with new soil and artificial turf placed on top. The stadium now holds bigger sporting events.

Events

The first international match played inside Ghazi Stadium was a football (soccer) match between Afghanistan and Iran on January 1, 1941, the game was a draw with neither team scoring. In 1963, American musician Duke Ellington held a concert here as part of his tour sponsored by the US State Department.

During the late 1990s the stadium was used as a venue for public executions by the Taliban government.

The stadium is currently used mostly for football matches between teams from different provinces of the country as well as international matches.

The stadium has also housed training facilities for the country's national women's boxing team, as documented in the film The Boxing Girls of Kabul.

Upgrade
On December 15, 2011, the Afghanistan National Olympic Committee celebrated the re-opening of the newly renovated Ghazi  in Kabul. Hosted by the Afghan Olympic Committee, the event was attended by U.S. Ambassador Ryan Crocker, Afghan Olympic President Lieutenant General Mohammad Zaher Aghbar, and Commander of International Security Assistance Force Afghanistan General John R. Allen.

The event, which also included nearly 5,000 spectators, featured a parade of athletes on the track, opening remarks, a ribbon cutting, and two abbreviated football matches involving both men's and women's football teams. The upgraded playing field will be FIFA certified allowing for future matches to be internationally sanctioned.

See also 
 Afghanistan Football Federation Stadium which opened in 2012 and has a capacity of 5,000

References

External links
 

Football venues in Afghanistan
Athletics (track and field) venues in Afghanistan
Afghanistan
Sport in Kabul
Multi-purpose stadiums
1923 establishments in Afghanistan
Sports venues completed in 1923